Agnelo Rossi (4 May 1913 – 21 May 1995) was a Brazilian cardinal of the Roman Catholic Church and dean of the Sacred College of Cardinals.

Biography
Rossi was born on 4 May 1913 in Joaquim Egidio, Brazil, in the Diocese of Campinas. In 1933 he left his Brazilian home for Rome. There he studied at the Pontifical College Pio Brasileiro and the Pontifical Gregorian University. He was ordained a priest on 27 March 1937 in the Patriarchal Lateran Basilica by Luigi Traglia, Vicegerent of Rome.

Rossi subsequently met duties in Brazil, as secretary to the Bishop of Campinas for one year and as faculty member of the Central Seminary of São Paulo and the faculty of economic science of the University of Campinas. He was canon of the cathedral chapter of Campinas in 1943–1956.

In 1956 Rossi was appointed Bishop of Barra do Piraí within the metropolitan district of Rio de Janeiro. Paulo de Tarso Campos, bishop of his home diocese Campinas, consecrated him in the same year. Rossi was named Archbishop of Ribeirão Preto in 1962. Two years later he was transferred to the Archiepiscopal see of São Paulo, which he held until 1970.

In the consistory of 1965 Rossi was created Cardinal-Priest by Pope Paul VI, and he received the title of Gran Madre di Dio. In 1970 he was appointed Prefect of the Sacred Congregation for the Evangelization of Peoples, the recently renamed Sacra Congregatio de Propaganda Fide. He participated in the two conclaves of 1978 (I, II).

In 1984 he was promoted to Cardinal Bishop of Sabina e Poggio Morteto by Pope John Paul II; two years later he received the title of Bishop of Ostia in addition, becoming Dean of the College of Cardinals.
He was President of the Administration of the Patrimony of the Holy See from 1984 to 1989.

He resigned as president in 1989 and as Dean in 1993; because he ceased to be Dean, he gave up the title of Bishop of Ostia. He subsequently returned to Brazil. Cardinal Rossi died on 21 May 1995 in Campinas.

See also

 Archiepiscopal see

Sources
 Catholic Hierarchy
 Cardinals of the Holy Roman Church

References

1913 births
1995 deaths
Deans of the College of Cardinals
Brazilian cardinals
Cardinal-bishops of Ostia
Cardinal-bishops of Sabina
20th-century Roman Catholic archbishops in Brazil
Brazilian people of Italian descent
Participants in the Second Vatican Council
People from Campinas
Pontifical Gregorian University alumni
Members of the Congregation for the Evangelization of Peoples
Members of the Congregation for the Propagation of the Faith
Administration of the Patrimony of the Apostolic See
Cardinals created by Pope Paul VI
Roman Catholic archbishops of Ribeirão Preto
Roman Catholic archbishops of São Paulo
Roman Catholic bishops of Barra do Piraí-Volta Redonda